Imamzadeh Hadi is related to the Safavid dynasty and is located in Ray.

Sources 

Mosques in Iran
Religious buildings and structures with domes
National works of Iran